Jeff is a masculine given name.

Jeff or JEFF may also refer to:

Arts and entertainment
 Jeff (album), a 2003 Jeff Beck album
 Jeff, also known as The Jeffrey Dahmer Files, a 2012 independent documentary film about Jeffrey Dahmer
 Jeff (1969 film), a French film starring Alain Delon
 Joseph Jefferson or Jeff Award, for excellence in theatre in the Chicago area
 Jazz Etno Funky Festival (JEFF), a music festival in Slovenia

Places

United States
 Jeff, Indiana, an unincorporated community
 Jeff, Missouri, an unincorporated community
 A local nickname for Jeffersonville, Indiana

Other uses
 JEFF, a file format allowing execution directly from static memory